Yuuguu was a desktop sharing and web conferencing application and the software company behind it, Yuuguu Ltd., was founded by Anish Kapoor and Philip Hemsted. Yuuguu was acquired in July 2010 By Via-Vox Ltd., holding company for PowWowNow, the conference call company.

Overview
Yuuguu offers cross network instant messaging, real time collaboration, instant screen sharing, web conferencing and remote support. The Yuuguu desktop client is cross-platform and there is also a web-based browser client.

In May 2009, Yuuguu added integration with Skype to its client.

See also
 Web conferencing
 Comparison of web conferencing software
 Collaborative software

References

Internet Protocol based network software
Remote desktop
Telecommuting
VoIP software
Online chat
Freeware
Cross-platform software
Software companies of the United Kingdom
Web applications
Web services
Companies based in Manchester
Web conferencing